Josh Meyers (born December 7, 1985) is an American former professional ice hockey player. He last played for the Krefeld Pinguine in the Deutsche Eishockey Liga (DEL). He was selected by the Los Angeles Kings in the 7th round (206th overall) of the 2005 NHL Entry Draft.

Playing career
Meyers played four seasons (2005–09) of college ice hockey at the University of Minnesota Duluth with the Minnesota–Duluth Bulldogs in the WCHA at the NCAA Division I level.

On May 30, 2010, he was signed as a free agent by the Calgary Flames.

After three seasons in Germany with Krefeld Pinguine of the DEL, Meyers was released to free agency and initially signed a one-year contract with Norwegian club, the Stavanger Oilers of the GET-ligaen on June 25, 2015. On July 15, 2015, Meyers retired from professional hockey.

Awards and honors

References

External links

1985 births
Abbotsford Heat players
Bolzano HC players
Ice hockey players from Minnesota
Krefeld Pinguine players
Living people
Los Angeles Kings draft picks
Minnesota Duluth Bulldogs men's ice hockey players
People from Alexandria, Minnesota
Sioux City Musketeers players
Utah Grizzlies (ECHL) players
American men's ice hockey defensemen